Marny Stanier (Midkiff) (born April 8, 1962) is a former on-camera meteorologist for The Weather Channel from April 1987 until November 2003. Controversy arose in late 2003 when she was released from The Weather Channel as a result of a company-wide staff reduction. Stanier subsequently filed a discrimination lawsuit, and in mid-2006, The Weather Channel settled for an undisclosed amount of money.

References

1962 births
Living people
American television meteorologists
The Weather Channel people
People from Atlanta